CKRN-DT (branded on-air as Radio-Canada Télévision CKRN) was a privately owned Ici Radio-Canada Télé-affiliated television station licensed to Rouyn-Noranda, Quebec, Canada, which essentially functioned as a semi-satellite of Montreal Radio-Canada flagship station CBFT-DT due to not having alternative non-network sources of programming available. It broadcast a digital signal on VHF channel 9 (or virtual channel 4.1 via PSIP) from a transmitter near Chemin Powell (north of Route 101) in Rouyn-Noranda.

Formerly owned by RNC Media, it was a sister station to TVA outlet CFEM-DT and Val-d'Or V (now Noovo) outlet CFVS-DT, and all three shared studios located on Avenue Murdoch and Avenue de la Saint Anne in Rouyn-Noranda. On cable, CKRN was available on Câblevision du Nord de Québec channel 7 and digital channel 411.

History
The station commenced broadcasting on December 25, 1957 as then-Radio-Nord's first television station, sharing its callsign with its radio sister station, CKRN AM 1400 (now CHOA-FM 96.5). It was originally a dual affiliate of Radio-Canada and the English language CBC. The CBC subsequently launched a rebroadcaster in Malartic of its English Montreal affiliate CBMT in the area in 1961, CBVD-TV channel 5, and CKRN dropped its English programming in 1962.

On March 1, 2018, it was announced that CKRN would cease broadcasting at midnight on March 25. RNC announced it wanted to concentrate its efforts on CFEM and CFVS. The shutdown of CKRN left Ici Radio-Canada Télé without an over-the-air outlet in the Abitibi-Témiscamingue region.

Transmitters

Notes

References

External links
 
 

KRN-DT
KRN-DT
KRN-DT
KRN-DT
Television channels and stations established in 1957
Television channels and stations disestablished in 2018
1957 establishments in Quebec
2018 disestablishments in Quebec
KRN-DT